The Cabrera Archipelago Maritime-Terrestrial National Park is a national park that includes the whole of the Cabrera Archipelago in the Balearic Islands, an autonomous community that is part of Spain.  The park is the largest in Spain, covering  including  of sea area.  The park attracts relatively few visitors due to its remoteness. There is no permanent population, but there might be at any given time just under 100 National Park staff members and other personnel on the islands.

The archipelago has great natural value. Due to its isolation throughout history, it has remained relatively unchanged. The coastal landscape of Cabrera is often considered one of the best preserved on the Spanish coast, and indeed in all of the Mediterranean, as a result.  The islands are blanketed by important colonies of seabirds and other endemic species. Due to its biotic wealth and abundance and variety of birds, the park has also been declared a Special Protection Area (SPA) for birds.  It is also a Site of Community Importance (SIC), and as such is integrated into the Natura 2000 network.  The park is likewise among the ranks of the Specially Protected Areas of Mediterranean Importance (SPAMI) under the protocols for protected marine areas established by the Barcelona Convention.

Administratively, the islands belong to the municipality of Palma de Mallorca despite their distance.

History

Use of the islands by the Spanish Armed Forces from 1973 to 1986 served as an obstacle to achieving protection for the archipelago.  In 1988, the Parliament of the Balearic Islands unanimously passed a resolution then sent to the Spanish Parliament "for the creation of the Cabrera Archipelago Maritime-Terrestrial National Park," which was later enacted into law  on April 29, 1991. The park, in addition to the law, is governed by the "Master Plan for Use and Management of the Cabrera Archipelago Maritime-Terrestrial National Park" approved by means of Order 58/2006 on July 1, 2006 by the Government of the Balearic Islands for a six-year period.

Limited military use of the area continues all the same.

Visiting
Cabrera Archipelago National Park is a restricted cruising destination, and boats may anchor only in the island's natural harbour or during the day in one other specified area. Many species survive on Cabrera that are rare in other parts of the Balearics, such as sea snails and the very unusual black lizard.

Surrounding water of Balearic Sea is rich in biodiversity. Various types of cetaceans such as sperm, pilot, dolphins, and fin whales are regular and others such as humpback and orca on occasions, and loggerhead turtles can be found.

Diving is strictly limited and a license allows for a one-day visit only. Excursions to the island are a rare event and are treasured by the diving community. Hiking possibilities are abundant generally on organised tours, although both the castle and the lighthouse can be accessed unsupervised.  There is a small visitors centre, a 14th-century castle and a museum, as well as a gift shop and bar.

See also
 Cabrera, Balearic Islands
 List of Spanish national parks

Bibliography
 Moreno, Jorge; Ballesteros, Enrique; Amengual Ramis, José.  Arxipièlag de Cabrera: parc nacional. Barcelona: Lunwerg Editores, 2001, .

References

External links

 Parque Nacional del Archipiélago de Cabrera (Ministerio de Medio Ambiente de España)

National parks of Spain
Protected areas of the Balearic Islands
Marine reserves of Spain
Special Protection Areas of Spain